Pipers Brook is a rural locality in the local government areas of Launceston, Dorset and George Town in the Launceston and North-east regions of Tasmania. The 2016 census determined a population of 93 for the state suburb of Pipers Brook.

History
The locality was named for Ensign Hugh Piper, a member of William Paterson's expedition to the Tamar in 1804. It was gazetted as a locality in 1961.

Geography
Pipers River forms the north-western boundary. Pipers Brook (the watercourse) flows through from south to north and then forms a section of the northern boundary.

Road infrastructure
Route B82 (Bridport Road) passes through from west to east. The C818 route (Pipers Brook Road) starts at an intersection with B82 in the centre and runs south through the locality and village before exiting. The C852 route (Bellingham Road) starts at an intersection with B82 in the centre and exits to the north.

References

Localities of City of Launceston
Localities of Dorset Council (Australia)
Localities of George Town Council
Towns in Tasmania